Fokstumyra Nature Reserve is a nature reserve established in 1923 in Dovrefjell, in the municipality of Dovre. It covers an area of eight km² of wetlands, and was the first nature reserve in Norway. The area is known for its rich bird fauna and plant diversity... It became a Ramsar site in 2002.

References

Nature reserves in Norway
Protected areas of Oppland
1923 establishments in Norway
Dovre
Ramsar sites in Norway